The Robert Award for Best Danish Film is presented at an annual Robert Award ceremony by the Danish Film Academy

Honorees

1980s 
 1984: Beauty and the Beast (Skønheden og udyret) directed by Nils Malmros
 1985: The Element of Crime (Forbrydelsens element) directed by Lars von Trier
 1986:  (De flyvende djævle) directed by Anders Refn
 1987:  (Flamberede hjerter) directed by Helle Ryslinge
 1988: Pelle the Conqueror (Pelle Erobreren) directed by Bille August
 1989:  (Skyggen af Emma) directed by Søren Kragh-Jacobsen

1990s 
 1990: Waltzing Regitze (Dansen med Regitze) directed by Kaspar Rostrup
 1991: Dance of the Polar Bears (Lad isbjørnene danse) directed by Birger Larsen
 1992: Europa directed by Lars von Trier
 1993: Pain of Love (Kærlighedens smerte) directed by Nils Malmros
 1994: The House of the Spirits (Åndernes hus) directed by Bille August
 1995: Nightwatch (Nattevagten) directed by Ole Bornedal
 1996:  (Menneskedyret) directed by 
 1997: Breaking the Waves directed by Lars von Trier
 1998: Barbara directed by Nils Malmros & Let's get lost directed by Jonas Elmer
 1999: The Celebration (Festen) directed by Thomas Vinterberg

2000s 
 2000: The One and Only (Den eneste ene) directed by Susanne Bier
 2001: The Bench (Bænken) directed by Per Fly
 Help! I'm a Fish (Hjælp, jeg er en fisk) directed by Stefan Fjeldmark, Greg Manwaring, and Michael Hegner (uncredited)
 2002: Kira's Reason: A Love Story (En kærlighedshistorie) directed by Ole Christian Madsen
 Mona's World (Monas verden) directed by Jonas Elmer
 One-Hand Clapping (At klappe med én hånd) directed by Gert Fredholm
 Shake It All About (En kort en lang) directed by Hella Joof
 The King Is Alive directed by Kristian Levring
 2003: Open Hearts (Elsker dig for evigt) directed by Susanne Bier
 I Am Dina (Jeg er Dina) directed by Ole Bornedal
 Okay directed by Jesper W. Nielsen
 Facing the Truth (At kende sandheden) directed by Nils Malmros
 Wilbur Wants to Kill Himself (Wilbur begår selvmord) directed by Lone Scherfig
 2004: The Inheritance (Arven) directed by Per Fly
 Dogville directed by Lars von Trier
 Move Me (Lykkevej) directed by Morten Arnfred
 Stealing Rembrandt (Rembrandt) directed by Jannik Johansen
 Reconstruction directed by Christoffer Boe
 2005: King's Game (Kongekabale) directed by Nikolaj Arcel
 Aftermath (Lad de små børn) directed by Paprika Steen
 Day and night directed by Simon Staho
 In Your Hands (Forbrydelser) directed by Annette K. Olesen
 Pusher II directed by Nicolas Winding Refn
 2006: Adam's Apples (Adams æbler) directed by Anders Thomas Jensen
 Dark Horse (Voksne mennesker) directed by Dagur Kári
  (Fluerne på væggen) directed by Åke Sandgren
 Manderlay (Manderlay) directed by Lars von Trier
 Manslaughter (Drabet) directed by Per Fly
 2007: We Shall Overcome (Drømmen) directed by Niels Arden Oplev
 A Soap (En soap) directed by Pernille Fischer Christensen
 After the Wedding (Efter brylluppet) directed by Susanne Bier
 Offscreen directed by Christoffer Boe
 Prague (Prag) directed by Ole Christian Madsen
 Princess directed by Anders Morgenthaler
 2008: The Art of Crying (Kunsten at græde i kor) directed by Peter Schønau Fog
 Daisy Diamond directed by Simon Staho
 Echo (Ekko) directed by Anders Morgenthaler
 Just Another Love Story (Kærlighed på film) directed by Ole Bornedal
  (Hvid nat) directed by Jannik Johansen
 2009: Terribly Happy (Frygtelig lykkelig) directed by Henrik Ruben Genz
 Fear Me Not (Den du frygter) directed by Kristian Levring
 Flame & Citron (Flammen & Citronen) directed by Ole Christian Madsen
  (Lille soldat) directed by Annette K. Olesen
 Worlds Apart (To verdener) directed by Niels Arden Oplev

2010s 
 2010: Antichrist directed by Lars von Trier
 Aching Hearts (Kærestesorger) directed by Nils Malmros
 Applause (Applaus) directed by Martin Zandvliet
 Deliver Us from Evil (Fri os fra det onde) directed by Ole Bornedal
 Old Boys directed by 
 2011: R directed by Tobias Lindholm and Michael Noer
 Brotherhood (Broderskab) directed by Nicolo Donato
 Everything Will Be Fine (Alting bliver godt igen) directed by Christoffer Boe
 Submarino directed by Thomas Vinterberg
 Truth About Men (Sandheden om mænd) directed by Nikolaj Arcel
 2012: Melancholia directed by Lars von Trier
 A Family (En familie) directed by Pernille Fischer Christensen
 A Funny Man (Dirch) directed by Martin Zandvliet
 Rosa Morena directed by Carlos Augusto de Oliveira
 SuperClásico directed by Ole Christian Madsen
 2013: A Hijacking (Kapringen) directed by Tobias Lindholm
 Teddy Bear (10 timer til paradis) directed by 
 Love Is All You Need (Den skaldede frisør ) directed by Susanne Bier
 A Royal Affair (En kongelig affære) directed by Nikolaj Arcel
  (Undskyld jeg forstyrrer) directed by Henrik Ruben Genz
 2014: The Hunt (Jagten) directed by Thomas Vinterberg
 Department Q: The Keeper of Lost Causes (Kvinden i buret) directed by 
 Nordvest directed by Michael Noer
 Sorrow and Joy (Sorg og glæde) directed by Nils Malmros
  directed by Christoffer Boe
 2015: Nymphomaniac Director's Cut directed by Lars Von Trier
 Department Q: The Absent One (Fasandræberne) directed by 
 Speed Walking (Kapgang) directed by Niels Arden Oplev
 Klumpfisken directed by 
 Silent Heart (Stille hjerte) directed by Bille August
 2016: Land of Mine (Under Sandet) directed by Martin Zandvliet
 The Idealist (Idealisten) directed by Christina Rosendahl
 A War (Krigen) directed by Tobias Lindholm
 Men & Chicken (Mænd og høns) directed by Anders Thomas Jensen
 Sommeren '92 directed by Kasper Barfoed
 2017: The Day Will Come (Der kommer en dag) directed by Jesper W. Nielsen
 Parents (Forældre) directed by Christian Tafdrup
 In the Blood (I blodet) directed by Rasmus Heisterberg
 The Commune (Kollektivet) directed by Thomas Vinterberg
 The Neon Demon (The Neon Demon) directed by Nicolas Winding Refn
 2018: Winter Brothers (Vinterbrødre) directed by Hlynur Pálmason
 A Terrible Woman (En frygtelig kvinde) directed by Christian Tafdrup
  (Mens vi lever) directed by 
 Darkland (Underverden) directed by Fenar Ahmad
 2019: The Guilty (Den skyldige) directed by Gustav Möller
 A Fortunate Man (Lykke-Per) directed by Bille August
 The House That Jack Built directed by Lars von Trier
  directed by Niclas Bendixen
  (Journal 64) directed by

2020s 
 2020: Queen of Hearts (Dronningen) directed by May el-Toukhy
 Before the Frost (Før frosten) directed by Michael Noer
 Daniel (Ser du månen, Daniel) directed by Niels Arden Oplev
  (Onkel) directed by 
  (Danmarks sønner) directed by 
 2021: Another Round (Druk) directed by Thomas Vinterberg
 A Perfectly Normal Family (En helt almindelig familie) directed by 
 Riders of Justice (Retfærdighedens ryttere) directed by Anders Thomas Jensen
 The Good Traitor (Vores mand i Amerika) directed by Christina Rosendahl
2022: Persona Non Grata – Producer: Daniel Mühlendorph; Director: Lisa Jespersen; Screenplay: Lisa Jespersen and Sara Isabella Jønsson
Margrete: Queen of the North – Producers: Birgitte Skov and Lars Bredo Rahbek; Director: Charlotte Sieling; Screenplay: Jesper Fink, Maya Ilsøe and Charlotte Sieling
The Pact – Producers: Jesper Morthorst and Karin Trolle; Director: Bille August; Screenplay: Christian Torpe
The Shadow in My Eye – Producers: Jonas Allen and Peter Bose; Director and Screenplay: Ole Bornedal
The Venus Effect – Producers: Rikke Sasja Lassen and Lise Orheim Stender; Director and Screenplay: Anna Emma Haudal

Filmmakers with multiple wins (3 or more)
Lars von Trier - 6
Thomas Vinterberg - 3

See also 

 Bodil Award for Best Danish Film
 Dogme 95

References

External links 
  

1984 establishments in Denmark
Awards established in 1984
Awards for best film
Danish Film